Colorina is a comune (municipality) in the Province of Sondrio in the Italian region Lombardy, located about  northeast of Milan and about  west of Sondrio.

The municipality of Colorina contains the frazioni (subdivisions, mainly villages and hamlets) Valle, Piona, and Selvetta.

Colorina borders the following municipalities: Berbenno di Valtellina, Buglio in Monte, Forcola, Fusine.

Demographic evolution

References

External links
 www.comune.colorina.so.it

Cities and towns in Lombardy